Tivoli One is a live album by pianist Duke Jordan's Trio recorded at the Tivolis Koncertsal and first released on the Danish SteepleChase label in 1984.

Reception

AllMusic reviewer Scott Yanow stated "This is a fine all-around trio date for veteran pianist Duke Jordan".

Track listing
All compositions by Duke Jordan except as indicated
 "Subway Blues" - 7:31
 "Embraceable You" (George Gershwin, Ira Gershwin) - 6:17
 "Night Train from Snekkersten" - 7:41
 "My Heart Skips a Beat" - 8:19 Bonus track on CD reissue
 "If I Did - Would You?" - 6:13 Bonus track on CD reissue
 "Glad I Met Pat" - 8:26 Bonus track on CD reissue
 "Four" (Eddie "Cleanhead" Vinson) - 5:28
 "Misty Thursday" - 4:31
 "I Remember April" (Gene de Paul, Patricia Johnston, Don Raye) - 8:32
 "Jordu" - 1:53

Personnel
Duke Jordan - piano
Wilbur Little - bass 
Dannie Richmond - drums

References

1984 live albums
Duke Jordan live albums
SteepleChase Records live albums